Mylothris croceus is a butterfly in the family Pieridae. It is found in Uganda, Rwanda and the Democratic Republic of the Congo. The habitat consists of forests.

Subspecies
Mylothris croceus croceus (Uganda, Rwanda, Democratic Republic of the Congo)
Mylothris croceus ituriensis Berger, 1981 (Democratic Republic of the Congo: Ituri Forest)

References

Butterflies described in 1896
Pierini
Butterflies of Africa
Taxa named by Arthur Gardiner Butler